Periyasekkadu is a neighbourhood of Chennai in Thiruvallur district in the state of Tamil Nadu, India. Periyasekkadu used to be a part of Madhavaram Municipality in Thiruvallur district. In 2011, Madhavaram Municipality was merged with Chennai Corporation. Periyasekkadu comes under ward 28 in Zone 3 (Madhavaram) of Chennai Corporation.

References

Neighbourhoods in Chennai
Cities and towns in Tiruvallur district